The denomination Mayor Synagogue may refer to:
 Mayor Synagogue, Istanbul, Turkey
 Mayor Synagogue, Bursa, Turkey